Ševal Zahirović (born 2 April 1972 in Kakanj, SFR Yugoslavia) is a retired Bosnian-Herzegovinian professional footballer.

Club career
Zahirović spent the latter years of his career in the Icelandic lower leagues.

International career
He was capped once for Bosnia and Herzegovina, in a February 1997 Dunhill Cup match against Zimbabwe.

References

External links

1972 births
Living people
People from Kakanj
Bosniaks of Bosnia and Herzegovina
Association football forwards
Bosnia and Herzegovina footballers
Bosnia and Herzegovina international footballers
FK Sarajevo players
FC Kärnten players
FK Rudar Kakanj players
NK Rudar Velenje players
Premier League of Bosnia and Herzegovina players
2. Liga (Austria) players
Austrian Football Bundesliga players
First League of the Federation of Bosnia and Herzegovina players
Slovenian PrvaLiga players
2. deild karla players
3. deild karla players
Bosnia and Herzegovina expatriate footballers
Expatriate footballers in Austria
Bosnia and Herzegovina expatriate sportspeople in Austria
Expatriate footballers in Slovenia
Bosnia and Herzegovina expatriate sportspeople in Slovenia
Expatriate footballers in Iceland
Bosnia and Herzegovina expatriate sportspeople in Iceland